Cardinal Hill Reservoir is a historic site in Jefferson County, Kentucky. It is listed on the National Register of Historic Places. It was designed by Chicago architect Victor Andre Matteson. A one-story structure of stone (ashlar), it includes Doric pilasters, full entablature, parapet wall, shouldered architraves, quoins, and balustraded stairs. Lights along front bank of old reservoir set on pedestal bases "with tomb-like structures" holding lights at corners.

See also
 Crescent Hill Reservoir
 Louisville Water Tower
 National Register of Historic Places listings in Jefferson County, Kentucky

References

National Register of Historic Places in Louisville, Kentucky
Landforms of Louisville, Kentucky
Reservoirs in Kentucky
Water supply infrastructure on the National Register of Historic Places
Infrastructure in Louisville, Kentucky
1931 establishments in Kentucky
Infrastructure completed in 1931